David Berbotto (born 7 July 1980 in Alba, Cuneo) is an Italian freestyle swimmer.

Berbotto's major achievement is the victory with the Italian relay in Budapest 2006, resulting in a new European Record.

David Berbotto made a bet before the European Championship of Budapest 2006 with his club's president Marco Durante. Since Italy won the 4 x 200 relay setting the new European record and Berbotto swum under 1:48.00 (1:47.87), Durante gave him an Alfa Brera.

Footnotes

References
 David Berbotto on agendadiana.com
 David Berbotto on Italian Swimming Federation's website  
 David Berbotto on nuotopedia.eu 

1980 births
Living people
People from Alba, Piedmont
Italian male swimmers
European Aquatics Championships medalists in swimming
Mediterranean Games gold medalists for Italy
Mediterranean Games bronze medalists for Italy
Swimmers at the 2001 Mediterranean Games
Swimmers at the 2005 Mediterranean Games
Universiade medalists in swimming
Mediterranean Games medalists in swimming
Universiade bronze medalists for Italy
Medalists at the 2003 Summer Universiade
Sportspeople from the Province of Cuneo
20th-century Italian people
21st-century Italian people